Joyllor Puñuna is a mountain in the Vilcanota  mountain range in the Andes of Peru, about 5,743 m (18,842 ft) high. It is situated on the border of the regions of Cusco and Puno. Joyllor Puñuna is the highest elevation on the Quelccaya Ice Cap.

References

Mountains of Peru
Mountains of Cusco Region
Mountains of Puno Region
Glaciers of Peru